The Wedding Album may refer to:

 Wedding Album, a 1969 album by John Lennon and Yoko Ono
 Wedding Album (Leon and Mary Russell album), 1976
 Duran Duran (1993 album), also known as The Wedding Album
 The Wedding Album (TV series), a FOX television pilot from 2006
 Cheech & Chong's Wedding Album, a 1974 comedy album recorded by Cheech & Chong
 Superman: The Wedding Album, a 1996 comic book featuring Superman
 "The Wedding Album" (short story), a 1999 science fiction story by David Marusek

See also
 Photograph album